Canthon, the tumblebugs, is a genus of Scarabaeidae or scarab beetles in the superfamily Scarabaeoidea.

Selected species 
 Canthon aberrans Harold, 1868
 Canthon acutiformis Balthasar, 1939
 Canthon acutoides Schmidt, 1922
 Canthon acutus Harold, 1868
 Canthon aequinoctialis Harold 1868
 Canthon angularis Harold, 1868 
 Canthon angustatus Harold, 1867
 Canthon histrio Lepeletier & Serville, 1828
 Canthon quadriguttatus Olivier, 1789
 Canthon smaragdulus Fabricius, 1781

 Names brought to synonymy
 Canthon elegans (Laporte, 1840), a synonym for Canthon quadriguttatus Olivier, 1789

See also
 List of Canthon species

References

External links 
 
 
 
 Canthon at insectoid.info

Deltochilini
Scarabaeidae genera